The Sockman (commissioned as The Sock) is a bronze statue in Loughborough town centre.

The sculpture depicts a man seated on a bollard, naked except for the eponymous sock on his left foot. The sock is symbolic of Loughborough's hosiery industry, and the plinth is engraved with images of the town's history.

The piece has become iconic, and is used as a symbol for Loughborough.

History 
In 1997, Charnwood Borough Council decided to have a sculpture to provide "an attractive feature and focus of public interest" in the newly-pedestrianised Loughborough Market Place. They chose a central site just in front of Loughborough Town Hall.

A competition was held in which five artists were selected to design a statue. A panel of local experts and laypeople were gathered to make the decision; the winning design was by Scottish sculptor, Shona Kinloch. Her piece was favoured for artistic quality, technical merit, and durability (being both weather and vandal resistant).

The council commissioned The Sock in April 1998 at a cost of £23,000.

References 

Loughborough
1998 sculptures
Statues in England
Sculptures of men in the United Kingdom
Bronze sculptures in England
Socks